Brindabella Station, sometimes referred to as the Brindabella Homestead, is located within the Brindabella Ranges in the state of New South Wales, Australia. It was the childhood home of the Australian author Miles Franklin. Brindabella was first settled by the Franklin family in 1846, but they were unable to settle permanently until 1861 due to Aboriginal settlement in the region. In the 20th century, the station was a favorite fishing spot of Malcolm Fraser.

References

Houses in New South Wales
Stations (Australian agriculture)
Brindabella Ranges
Pastoral leases in New South Wales